Thomas Joseph John Higgins Jr. (born July 13, 1954) is the defensive coordinator for the Alberta Golden Bears football team in U Sports. He has previously served as the Director of Officiating for the Canadian Football League and is a former Canadian and American football player, head coach, and general manager.

Early years
Higgins, the son of a former Philadelphia Eagles tackle, Tom Higgins Sr., was a high school football standout at Colonia High School in Woodbridge Township, New Jersey. He played nose guard at North Carolina State University. He was an All-American and was a starter in four consecutive bowl games. He was also an All-American wrestler at NC State.

Professional playing career
After graduating from college in 1976, Higgins attempted to enter the National Football League, but was not selected in the 1976 NFL Draft. He instead played in the Canadian Football League with the Calgary Stampeders for three years. In 1979, Higgins was signed by the Buffalo Bills and played one year in the United States, before returning to Saskatchewan Roughriders in the CFL.

Coaching career
After retiring as a player, Higgins began coaching at the University of Calgary, winning the 1983 CIS title in the second of his three years as an assistant coach under Canadian Football Hall of Fame coach Peter Connellan. In 1985, Higgins joined the Stampeders coaching staff, serving in many different capacities until becoming a head coach in 2001.

Higgins became head coach of the CFL's Edmonton Eskimos later that year, leading the team to the playoffs in each of his four seasons. In 2002 and 2003, he won division titles, and he won a single Grey Cup as a head coach, with the Eskimos in 2003.

In 2005, he returned to the Calgary Stampeders as head coach. He held this position for three years, making the playoffs in each. He was fired after a first round loss during the 2007 playoffs.

Higgins served as the Director of Officiating from April 2008 to December 2013.

Higgins was hired as the new head coach of the Montreal Alouettes on February 24, 2014. Tom coached a historic 2014 football season starting 1–7, turning the team around to a 9-9 second-place finish, hosting a play off game and defeating the BC Lions. On August 21, 2015, Alouettes ownership relieved Tom of his coaching duties.

Higgins was hired in early 2020 as the defensive coordinator of the University of Alberta Golden Bears.

CFL head coaching record

Personal
Tom and his wife Sharon have three grown children, Holly, Hillary and Thomas.

References

1954 births
Living people
American football linebackers
American players of Canadian football
Buffalo Bills players
Calgary Stampeders players
Canadian football linebackers
Colonia High School alumni
Edmonton Elks coaches
Edmonton Elks general managers
Montreal Alouettes coaches
NC State Wolfpack football players
People from Woodbridge Township, New Jersey
Saskatchewan Roughriders players
Calgary Dinos football coaches
Calgary Stampeders coaches